Scheerbart, Scheerbarth are surname of:
 Paul Scheerbart

Scherbart 
 Hans Scherbart

Scherbarth 
  (born 1929), German author, illustrator
  (1930–2000), German graphic artist, painter
 Robert "Bob" Elmer Scherbarth (1926–2009), a catcher in Major League Baseball
 Tobias Scherbarth (born 1985), German athlete

German-language surnames
Occupational surnames